Caspar Babypants is the stage name of children's music artist Chris Ballew, who is also the vocalist and bassist of The Presidents of the United States of America.

History
Ballew's first brush with children's music came in 2002, when he recorded and donated an album of traditional children's songs to the nonprofit Program for Early Parent Support titled "PEPS Sing A Long!" Although that was a positive experience for him, he did not consider making music for families until he met his wife, collage artist Kate Endle. Her art inspired Ballew to consider making music that "sounded like her art looked" as he has said. Ballew began writing original songs and digging up nursery rhymes and folk songs in the public domain to interpret and make his own. The first album, Here I Am!, was recorded during the summer of 2008 and released in February 2009.

Ballew began to perform solo as Caspar Babypants in the Seattle area in January 2009. Fred Northup, a Seattle-based comedy improvisor, heard the album and offered to play as his live percussionist.  Northrup also suggested his frequent collaborator Ron Hippe as a keyboard player. "Frederick Babyshirt" and "Ronald Babyshoes" were the Caspar Babypants live band from May 2009 to April 2012. Both Northup and Hippe appear on some of his recordings but since April 2012 Caspar Babypants has exclusively performed solo. The reasons for the change were to include more improvisation in the show and to reduce the sound levels so that very young children and newborns could continue to attend without being overstimulated. 

Ballew has made two albums of Beatles covers as Caspar Babypants. Baby Beatles! came out in September 2013 and Beatles Baby! came out in September 2015.

Ballew runs the Aurora Elephant Music record label, books shows, produces, records, and masters the albums himself. Distribution for the albums is handled by Burnside Distribution in Portland, Oregon.

Caspar Babypants has released a total of 17 albums. The 17th album, BUG OUT!, was released on May 1st, 2020. His album FLYING HIGH! was nominated for a Grammy Award for Best Children's Album. All 17 of the albums feature cover art by Ballew's wife, Kate Endle.

"FUN FAVORITES!" and "HAPPY HITS!" are two vinyl-only collections of hit songs that Caspar Babypants has released in the last couple of years.

Discography
Albums
 PEPS (2002)
 Here I Am! (Released 03/17/09) Special guests: Jen Wood, Fysah Thomas
 More Please! (Released 12/15/09) Special guests: Fred Northup, Ron Hippe
 This Is Fun! (Released 11/02/10)  Special guests: Fred Northup, Ron Hippe, Krist Novoselic, Charlie Hope
 Sing Along! (Released 08/16/11) Special guests: Fred Northup, Ron Hippe, "Weird Al" Yankovic, Stone Gossard, Frances England, Rachel Loshak
 Hot Dog! (Released 4/17/12) Special guests: Fred Northup, Ron Hippe, Rachel Flotard (Visqueen)
 I Found You! (released 12/18/12) Special guests: Steve Turner (Mudhoney), Rachel Flotard (Visqueen), John Richards
 Baby Beatles! (released 9/15/13)
 Rise And Shine! (released 2014)
 Night Night! (released 3/17/15)
 Beatles Baby! (released 9/18/2015)
 Away We Go! (released 8/12/2016)
 Winter Party! (released 11/18/16)
 Jump For Joy! (released 08/18/17)
 Sleep Tight! (released 01/19/18)
 Keep It Real! (released 08/17/18)
 Best Beatles! (released 03/29/19)
 Flying High! (released 08/16/19)
 Bug Out! (released 05/1/20)
 Happy Heart! (11/13/20)
 Easy Breezy! (Upcoming-2021/2022)
Appearances
 Many Hands: Family Music for Haiti CD (released 2010) – Compilation of various artists
 Songs Stories And Friends: Let's Go Play – Charlie Hope (released 2011) – vocals on Alouette
 Shake It Up, Shake It Off (released 2012) – Compilation of various artists
 Keep Hoping Machine Running – Songs Of Woody Guthrie (released 2012) – Compilation of various artists
 Apple Apple – The Harmonica Pocket (released 2013) – vocals on Monkey Love
 Simpatico – Rennee and Friends (released 2015) – writer and vocals on I Am Not Afraid
 Sundrops – The Harmonica Pocket (released 2015) – vocals on Digga Dog Kid

References

External links

Official Site
Album Artist Kate Endle

American children's musicians